Klaas Henricus Dominicus Maria Dijkhoff (born 13 January 1981) is a Dutch legal scholar and politician who led the People's Party for Freedom and Democracy in the House of Representatives from 2017 to 2021. He previously was Minister of Defence (2017) and State Secretary for Security and Justice (2015–2017).

A jurist by occupation, Dijkhoff resides in Breda. He was elected as a member of the House of Representatives in the 2010 general election. After the resignation of Fred Teeven, he was appointed to succeed him and resigned as a parliamentarian the same day he took office as State Secretary at the Ministry of Security and Justice in the Second Rutte cabinet on 20 March 2015. After the resignation of Minister of Defence Jeanine Hennis-Plasschaert, Dijkhoff was nominated to serve out the remainder of her term in the already demissionary Second Rutte cabinet and resigned as State Secretary for Security and Justice on 4 October 2017 and served as Minister of Defence until the Third Rutte cabinet was installed on 26 October 2017.

Dijkhoff announced in October 2020 that he would retire from politics following the 2021 general election.

Early life and education 
Klaas Henricus Dominicus Maria Dijkhoff was born on 13 January 1981 in the town of Soltau in Germany. He is the son of officer Henricus Marikus Cornelis Dijkhoff and nurse Petronella Dominicus Maria Thijssen.

Dijkhoff went to secondary school in Eindhoven, where he did the gymnasium programme. He then studied Dutch law at the Tilburg University, where he successively obtained an LLM degree in international and European law in 2003, an MPhil degree cum laude in 2005, and a PhD degree in law of war in 2010 with his dissertation titled War, Law and Technology.

Career

Early years
While writing his thesis he worked as a legal scholar at Tilburg University and Inholland University of Applied Sciences. He also had his own consultancy firm specialised in legal affairs and IT.

Dijkhoff became a member of the VVD in 1998. He held several positions within the party such as member of the election program committee in 2009–2010 and from 11 March 2010 until 7 February 2013 he was a member as well as VVD fraction leader of the municipal council of Breda.

House of Representatives
On 17 June 2010, he was elected as a member of the House of Representatives. In 2013, Dijkhoff got appointed national campaign leader for the municipal council elections of March 2014. He first became the party's spokesperson on development aid. He booked his biggest success in stopping subsidies to development organisations with a chairman earning more than €124,000.00 a year. Later on he became the spokesperson on European affairs. He was then the VVD spokesperson on matters of homeland security, public safety and police affairs.

Dijkhoff passed two motions in the House of Representatives in the battle against Jihad fighters. His motions called upon the cabinet to stop free travel to conflict zones and denationalisation of Jihad fighters. In 2013, he passed legislation through parliament making identity fraud a punishable offence.

Second Rutte cabinet

He resigned on 20 March 2015, when he became State Secretary for Security and Justice in the Second Rutte cabinet. His portfolio included Integration, Immigration, Asylum Affairs, Public Prosecution Service, Privacy Policy, Administrative Law, Family Law, Youth Justice, International Law, Prison Administration, Gambling Policy, Copyright Law, Rehabilitation, Prevention, Debt Management and Minority Affairs. On 4 October 2017, he resigned to become Minister of Defence following the resignation of Jeanine Hennis-Plasschaert.

Parliamentary leader
Dijkhoff was reelected to the House of Representatives in the general election of 2017. When the Third Rutte cabinet was inaugurated on 26 October 2017, he succeeded Rutte as leader of the People's Party for Freedom and Democracy in the House of Representatives.

Other activities
 World Economic Forum (WEF), member of the Europe Policy Group, from 2017.

 Philips Sport Vereniging (PSV), supervisory board member, from 2021.

Personal life 
Dijkhoff lives together with his wife in Breda. In July 2017, their daughter was born. In September 2018, he wrote an open letter to Archsbishop Wim Eijk, explaining that he was leaving the Catholic Church and revoking his membership after Eijk had criticised him in an interview.

References

External links

  Dr. K.H.D.M. (Klaas) Dijkhoff Parlement & Politiek
  Klaas Dijkhoff Tweede Kamer der Staten-Generaal

 
 

 
 

 
 

1981 births
Living people
Dutch consultants
Dutch legal educators
Dutch legal scholars
Former Roman Catholics
Ministers of Defence of the Netherlands
Members of the House of Representatives (Netherlands)
Municipal councillors of Breda
People's Party for Freedom and Democracy politicians
People from Breda
People from Heidekreis
State Secretaries for Justice of the Netherlands
Tilburg University alumni
Academic staff of Tilburg University
21st-century Dutch educators
21st-century Dutch jurists
21st-century Dutch politicians